Malcolm Edward "Red" Wiseman (July 12, 1913 – April 11, 1993) was a Canadian basketball player, born in Winnipeg, who competed in the 1936 Summer Olympics.

He was part of the Canadian basketball team, which won the silver medal. He played all six matches including the final.

References

External links
Malcolm Wiseman's profile at databaseOlympics.com
Biography of Malcolm Wiseman at the Windsor/Essex County Sports Hall of Fame

1913 births
1993 deaths
Basketball players from Winnipeg
Basketball players at the 1936 Summer Olympics
Canadian men's basketball players
Olympic basketball players of Canada
Olympic medalists in basketball
Olympic silver medalists for Canada
Medalists at the 1936 Summer Olympics